The 2014/15 FIS Ski Flying World Cup was the 18th official World Cup season in ski flying awarded with small crystal globe as the subdiscipline of FIS Ski Jumping World Cup.

Calendar

Men

Team 

Only one round competition in Planica team event. Second round cancelled because of strong wind.

Standings

Ski Flying

Nations Cup unofficial

References 

World cup
FIS Ski Flying World Cup